Robert Myers (born December 26, 1991) is an American football guard for the New Jersey Generals of the United States Football League (USFL). He played college football at Tennessee State, and was drafted by the Baltimore Ravens in the fifth round of the 2015 NFL Draft.

Early years
Myers attended La Vergne High School in La Vergne, Tennessee.

College career
Myers played at Tennessee State from 2010 to 2014. In his senior season in 2014, he started in all 12 games. He was named the All-Ohio Valley Conference second-team for his accomplishments in the 2015 season.

Professional career

Baltimore Ravens
Myers was selected by the Baltimore Ravens in the fifth round (176th overall pick) of the 2015 NFL Draft. On September 5, 2015, he was released by the Ravens.

Indianapolis Colts
On September 6, 2015, Myers was claimed off waivers by the Indianapolis Colts. On September 11, 2015, he was waived by the Colts.

Second stint with the Ravens
On September 21, 2015, Myers was signed to the Baltimore Ravens' practice squad.

Denver Broncos
On December 30, 2015, Myers was signed off the Ravens' practice squad to the Denver Broncos active roster.

In the 2015 season, Myers and the Broncos made the Super Bowl. Myers was inactive for Super Bowl 50. The Broncos defeated the Carolina Panthers by a score of 24–10.

On September 3, 2016, Myers was waived by the Broncos.

Seattle Seahawks
On September 27, 2016, Myers was signed to the Seattle Seahawks' practice squad. He signed a reserve/future contract with the Seahawks on January 20, 2017.

On August 8, 2017, Myers was waived/injured by the Seahawks and placed on injured reserve. He was released by the team on August 14, 2017.

Memphis Express
In 2018, Myers signed with the Memphis Express for the 2019 season. He was waived on March 7, 2019, and re-signed on March 13, 2019. The league ceased operations in April 2019.

Seattle Dragons
In October 2019, Myers was selected by the Seattle Dragons in the 2020 XFL Draft. He was waived during final roster cuts on January 22, 2020. Myers signed with the Team 9 practice squad during the regular season. He was re-signed by the Dragons on March 9, 2020. He had his contract terminated when the league suspended operations on April 10, 2020.

The Spring League
Myers was selected by the Conquerors of The Spring League during its player selection draft on October 11, 2020. He remained on the roster in May 2021.

New Jersey Generals
On March 10, 2022, Myers was drafted by the New Jersey Generals of the United States Football League.

References

1991 births
Living people
American football offensive guards
Baltimore Ravens players
Denver Broncos players
Indianapolis Colts players
Memphis Express (American football) players
People from Rutherford County, Tennessee
Players of American football from Chicago
Players of American football from Tennessee
Seattle Dragons players
Seattle Seahawks players
Team 9 players
Tennessee State Tigers football players
The Spring League players
New Jersey Generals (2022) players